Ballooning may refer to:

 Hot air ballooning
 Balloon (aeronautics)
 Ballooning (spider)
 Ballooning degeneration, a disease
 Memory ballooning

See also
 Balloon (disambiguation)